Pascal Lance (born 23 January 1964) is a retired French cyclist. He competed at the 1988 Summer Olympics in the 100 km team time trial and finished in fourth place.

He won the one-day race Chrono des Nations (1987, 1988, 1994 and 1995) and the multistage races Circuit de Lorraine (1985 and 1988) and Tour du Poitou-Charentes (1992). In the Duo Normand two-man team time trial he finished second in 1993 and third in 1996 and 1997.

References 

1964 births
Living people
People from Toul
French male cyclists
Olympic cyclists of France
Cyclists at the 1988 Summer Olympics
Sportspeople from Meurthe-et-Moselle
Cyclists from Grand Est